Befuraline (DIV-154) is a psychoactive drug and member of the piperazine chemical class which was developed in Germany in the 1970s. Befuraline has stimulant and antidepressant effects and has seen some use in Germany and France, although it has never become widely used. Befuraline's active metabolite benzylpiperazine is likely to contribute to its effects.

Synthesis

A one-step coupling between coumarilic acid (benzofuran-2-carboxylic acid) [496-41-3] (1) and benzylpiperazine (BzP) (2) gives an amide, and hence Befuraline (3).

See also
 Substituted piperazine
 Fipexide
 Piberaline

References

Anthelmintics
Piperazines
Benzofuran-2-carboxamides
Serotonin-norepinephrine-dopamine releasing agents